{{Taxobox
|image = Illustration Vaccaria hispanica0.jpg
|regnum = Plantae
|unranked_divisio = Angiosperms
|unranked_classis = Eudicots
|unranked_ordo = Core eudicots
|ordo = Caryophyllales
|familia = Caryophyllaceae
|genus = Vaccaria
|genus_authority = Wolf
|species = V. hispanica
|binomial = Vaccaria hispanica
|binomial_authority = (Mill.) Rauschert
|synonyms = Saponaria hispanica Mill.Saponaria vaccaria L.Vaccaria pyramidata Medik.Vaccaria segetalis (Neck.) Garcke ex Asch.Vaccaria vaccaria (L.) HuthVaccaria vulgaris Host
}}Vaccaria is a monotypic genus of flowering plants in the family Caryophyllaceae containing the single species Vaccaria hispanica. It is known by several common names including cowherb, cowcockle, cow basil,  cow soapwort, and  prairie carnation. Its subspecies were previously treated as separate species.

It is an annual herb with blue-gray, waxy herbage and pale pink flowers.

It is native to Eurasia but can be found in many other regions as an introduced species and a common weed.

The seeds of Vaccaria'' are used in Chinese medicine. This medicinal ingredient is known as Wang Bu Liu Xing. It is supposed to promote diuresis and milk secretion, activate blood circulation and relieve swelling.

References

External links
Jepson Manual Treatment
USDA Plants Profile

Washington Burke Museum
Flora of Western Australia
Photo gallery

Caryophyllaceae
Monotypic Caryophyllaceae genera
Saponaceous plants